Wheeler House Complex is a historic home and commercial structures located at Leonardsville in Madison County, New York. The complex consists of the Weheeler House and bank, the carriage house, and the Wheeler commercial block.  The Wheeler House was built in 1874 and is a -story, frame building with an engaged octagonal tower in the Italianate style.  The Wheeler Block was also built in 1874 and is a 2-story frame structure with pedimented gable ends.

It was listed on the National Register of Historic Places in 1983.

References

Houses on the National Register of Historic Places in New York (state)
Italianate architecture in New York (state)
Houses completed in 1874
Houses in Madison County, New York
National Register of Historic Places in Madison County, New York